Varkaus Airport  is an airport in Joroinen, Finland, about  south of Varkaus.

Airlines and destinations
The only scheduled service offered by Flybe Nordic to Helsinki ended in January 2014 leaving the airport without any scheduled flights.

Statistics

See also
 List of the largest airports in the Nordic countries

References

External links

 
 AIP Finland – Varkaus Airport
 
 
 

Airports in Finland
Airport
Buildings and structures in North Savo